Portskerra is a hamlet that overlooks Melvich Bay in Sutherland, Highland, Scotland.

The village of Melvich is less than a mile southeast.

References

Populated places in Sutherland